Utah Community Credit Union (UCCU) is a federally accredited credit union based in Provo, Utah. It is regulated under the authority of the National Credit Union Administration (NCUA).
UCCU was founded at Brigham Young University as the BYU Employees' Federal Credit Union.

In 1977 the company moved off campus to a location on Canyon Road in Provo, and changed its name to Universal Campus Credit Union.

In 2000, the company had total assets of $270 million. It changed its name to the current name of Utah Community Credit Union in 2000 to reflect its growing membership beyond that of Brigham Young University. Similarly, the field of membership expanded in 2000 to include anyone who lives, works, or attends school in Utah County. That year the credit union opened its seventh branch in Pleasant Grove, Utah.

In 2008, UCCU announced a deal with Utah Valley University which allowed students and faculty to use their student ID card as a debit card through UCCU. In 2010, the company purchased the naming rights for then-David O. Mckay Events Center in on the campus of Utah Valley University in Orem, Utah.

In 2018, Jeff Sermon retired as CEO after holding that position for 15 years. He was succeeded by Bret Van Ausdal.  In 2019, the company finalized purchase of a new corporate headquarters in the Riverwoods in Provo. In 2021, in connection with the state of Utah, UCCU became the first financial institution in the state to accept a mobile driver's license as a valid form of ID.

References 

Credit unions based in Utah
Companies based in Utah
Banks established in 1959
1959 establishments in Utah